Eugenio Soto Cañete (28 December 1909 – 3 January 1998) was a Chilean footballer. He played in one match for the Chile national football team in 1937. He was also part of Chile's squad for the 1937 South American Championship.

After his playing career, Soto managed Chilean club Green Cross, guiding them to their first and only Primera División title in 1945.

References

External links
 

1909 births
1998 deaths
Chilean footballers
Chile international footballers
Association football goalkeepers
Chilean football managers
Deportes Magallanes footballers
Colo-Colo footballers